Elaeis melanococca can refer to:

 Elaeis melanococca Gaertn., a synonym of Elaeis guineensis, the African oil palm
 Elaeis melanococca Mart. (an illegitimate name, but often used), a synonym of  Elaeis oleifera, an American oil palm